Genuanoconus has become a synonym of Conus (Kalloconus) da Motta, 1991 represented as Conus Linnaeus, 1758

It was a genus  of sea snails, marine gastropod mollusks in the family Conidae, the cone snails and their allies.

Distinguishing characteristics
The Tucker & Tenorio 2009 taxonomy distinguishes Genuanoconus from Conus in the following ways:

 Genus Conus sensu stricto Linnaeus, 1758
 Shell characters (living and fossil species)
The basic shell shape is conical to elongated conical, has a deep anal notch on the shoulder, a smooth periostracum and a small operculum. The shoulder of the shell is usually nodulose and the protoconch is usually multispiral. Markings often include the presence of tents except for black or white color variants, with the absence of spiral lines of minute tents and textile bars.
Radular tooth (not known for fossil species)
The radula has an elongated anterior section with serrations and a large exposed terminating cusp, a non-obvious waist, blade is either small or absent and has a short barb, and lacks a basal spur.
Geographical distribution
These species are found in the Indo-Pacific region.
Feeding habits
These species eat other gastropods including cones.

 Genus Genuanoconus Tucker & Tenorio, 2009
Shell characters (living and fossil species)
The shell is turgid in shape, and the body is not greatly elongated.  The protoconch is multispiral, and the whorl tops lack cords.  The shoulders are rounded and indistinct.  The anal notch is shallow.  The body has a color pattern of alternating stripes of black and white squares over the base color.  The periostracum is thin and smooth, and the operculum is small to moderate in size.
Radular tooth (not known for fossil species)
The anterior sections of the radular tooth is shorter than the posterior section.  The blade is long, and is more than half as long as the anterior section of the tooth.  A basal spur is present, and the barb is short.  The blade has one row of serrations.  The terminating cusp is large, pointed and recurved.
Geographical distribution
The sole species in this genus is endemic to the West African region.
Feeding habits
This cone snail is vermivorous, meaning that the cone snail preys on Amphinomid polychaete worms.

Species list
This list of species is based on the information in the World Register of Marine Species (WoRMS) list. The sole species within the genus Genuanoconus is:
 Genuanoconus genuanus (Linnaeus, 1758) is a synonym of  Conus genuanus Linnaeus, 1758

References

Further reading 
 Kohn A. A. (1992). Chronological Taxonomy of Conus, 1758-1840". Smithsonian Institution Press, Washington and London.
 Monteiro A. (ed.) (2007). The Cone Collector 1: 1-28.
 Berschauer D. (2010). Technology and the Fall of the Mono-Generic Family The Cone Collector 15: pp. 51-54
 Puillandre N., Meyer C.P., Bouchet P., and Olivera B.M. (2011), Genetic divergence and geographical variation in the deep-water Conus orbignyi complex (Mollusca: Conoidea)'', Zoologica Scripta 40(4) 350-363.

External links
 To World Register of Marine Species
  Gastropods.com: Conidae setting forth the genera recognized therein.

Conidae